SinceThe80s is an American record label, management, and publishing company founded by Barry "Hefner" Johnson, Kei Henderson, and Zekiel "Zeke" Nicholson, based in Atlanta and Pittsburgh. The label is a joint venture with Motown, a subsidiary of Universal Music Group.

History
Barry "Hefner" Johnson started in the music industry from marketing and promotion with Warner Music Group and Sony Music, promoting Pittsburgh artists such as Wiz Khalifa and Mac Miller. In 2014, Kei Henderson met 21 Savage during the annual Atlanta hip-hop festival, A3C, and became his manager, while Johnson and Zekiel Nicholson co-manage JID and EarthGang, who both signed with Dreamville in 2017. They made the progression from management to label executives since they already take on those responsibilities as managers, and launched SinceThe80s. Henderson told Billboard, "I realized how much I was doing on my own, everything from merch design, web design, staffing a team [and] hiring radio."

In an interview with Billboard, they said the label is envisioned "as a collaborative brand that seeks to find and nurture the next wave of superstars from the culture hub of Atlanta." In 2019, the founders of label played an intricate part in Dreamville's recording sessions for the compilation album Revenge of the Dreamers III. Johnson and Nicholson convinced J. Cole to host the studio sessions at Tree Sound Studios in Atlanta instead of Los Angeles. Every artist on the label was invited to the sessions in Atlanta with the goal of fostering connections with other artists that attended. Johnson says Cole has "always been supportive" of SinceThe80s and has relationships with other Atlanta-based labels such as Love Renaissance.

The label houses artists Njomza, Hardo, Asiahn, and Jordan Hawkins. In 2020, the label added Metro Marrs to the roster who signed a joint deal with Quality Control, as well as Benji who is part of the collective Spillage Village. The also house producers Christo, Malik Baptiste, Tommy Brown, and Pyrex.

Publishing
District 80 Publishing is an American music publisher part of SinceThe80s. The company published number 1 singles such as Ariana Grande's "Thank U, Next", "7 Rings", and "Positions", co-written by Tommy Brown and Njomza, "Better Off" and "Make Up", co-written by Malik Baptiste.

Roster

Current artists

Management
 JID
 EarthGang
 SoFaygo
 Mike Dimes

In-house producers
 Christo
 Malik Baptiste
 Tommy Brown
 Pyrex

Discography

Studio albums

Extended plays

Mixtapes

References

American record labels
Contemporary R&B record labels
Hip hop record labels
Record labels established in 2018
Music publishing companies of the United States